The 2021 Asian Women's Handball Championship was the 18th edition of the championship held from 15 to 25 September 2021 in Amman, Jordan under the aegis of Asian Handball Federation. It is the third time in history that the championship is organised by the Jordan Handball Federation. It also acted as the qualification tournament for the 2021 World Women's Handball Championship, with the top five teams from the championship directly qualifying for the event to be held in Spain.

On 9 August 2020, the AHF decided to postpone the championship due to the COVID-19 pandemic. Previously, the championship was scheduled to take place from 10 to 22 December 2020. On 3 August 2021, the AHF announced to move the event from South Korea to Jordan due to the pandemic.

South Korea won their fifth straight and 15th overall title aftet defeating Japan in the final.

Draw
The draw was held in Amman, Jordan on 11 August 2021 at 18:00.

Seeding
Teams were seeded according to the AHF COC regulations and rankings of the previous edition of the championship. Teams who had not participate in the previous edition were in Pot 5. As organizer, Jordan had the right to choose their group.

 For the first time, China did not participate.
 Since 2018 countries from Oceania (Australia and New Zealand) may participate in the Asian Championships and may qualify for the World Championship if one of them finishes within the top five.
 In August 2021, Afghanistan, who was drawn in Group B, withdrew from the championship due to the fall of Kabul. In the same time, India, also drawn in Group B, also withdrew from the championship due to unavoidable circumstances. As a consequence, Palestine and Syria were added to Group B to replace those two countries.
 In September 2021, a few days before the start of the championship, Qatar withdrew from the championship due to the COVID-19 pandemic.

Preliminary round
All times are local (UTC+3).

Group A

Group B

Knockout stage

Bracket

5–8th place bracket

Ninth place game

5–8th place semifinals

Semifinals

Seventh place game

Fifth place game

Third place game

Final

Final standing

References

Asia
Asian Handball Championships
Asian Women's Handball Championship
Asian Women's Handball Championship
September 2021 sports events in Asia
2021 in Jordanian sport
International handball competitions hosted by Jordan
Sports competitions in Amman